The William Sever House is an historic house at 2 Linden Street in Kingston, Massachusetts.  Built in 1768, it is a good local example of Georgian and Federal period architecture.  Its builder, William Sever, was a prominent local political figure and businessman, serving in the colonial legislature for many years.  The house was listed on the National Register of Historic Places in 1978.

Description and history
The William Sever House stands in the central village of Kingston, on the north side of Linden Street, a short street between Main Street and Landing Road.  The house is a wood-frame structure,  stories in height, with a hipped roof and clapboarded exterior.  The main facade is five bays wide, with sash windows arranged symmetrically around the main entrance. The entrance is framed by a broad surround with fluted Doric pilasters and a corniced entablature.  The property includes a barn and carriage house, each of which date to the late 19th century.

The house was built in 1768 for William Sever, a prominent local merchant who began service as a town representative to the colonial legislature in 1750.  The house originally had a gambrel roof, which was raised around 1800 to its present hip configuration.  A Federal style balustrade added at that time was removed around 1924.  The house remained in the Sever family until the early 20th century.

See also
National Register of Historic Places listings in Plymouth County, Massachusetts

References

Houses completed in 1768
Kingston, Massachusetts
Houses in Plymouth County, Massachusetts
National Register of Historic Places in Plymouth County, Massachusetts
Houses on the National Register of Historic Places in Plymouth County, Massachusetts
1768 establishments in Massachusetts